Carlbrook School was a private, coeducational, college preparatory boarding school located on  in Halifax, Virginia. It was non-sectarian and covered grades 9 through 12. As of 2014, it reported an enrollment of 80 students. The school closed permanently in December 2015. At that time, it had graduated almost 700 alumni. Carlbrook's mission statement was to help students discover, internalize and effectively utilize the intellectual and personal resources necessary to succeed in college and in life.

History
Carlbrook was founded in early 2002 by Cascade School graduates Robert "Grant" Price, Jr. and Justin J. Merritt. Within the first week of their opening, there were seven students enrolled. By June 2003, it had grown to 89 students. All new students were required to complete a wilderness therapy program before enrolling. In 2003, a school official explained that wilderness programs help prepare students for success in the school program and function as a "filter," meaning that students who successfully complete these programs are more likely to succeed at Carlbrook. Grant hired several former CEDU staff to implement a similar emotional growth program.

Admissions
Admission to Carlbrook was selective, focusing on students of high aptitude and potential who had struggled academically or socially in previous educational environments.  Carlbrook was accredited by the Southern Association of Colleges and Schools and the Virginia Council for Private Education, and was a member of the Secondary School Admission Test Board, the Small Boarding Schools Association, and the Educational Records Bureau.

Academics
The school followed a quarter-based academic calendar and awarded high school diplomas in accordance with Virginia Department of Education guidelines. There were multiple Advanced Placement courses and several advanced and dual-enrollment offerings; in addition to the school's academic requirements, graduating students were required to demonstrate leadership and character through extracurricular involvement and/or community service. Carlbrook reported that over the school's first decade, its graduates were accepted to over 500 colleges and universities.

Carlbrook's Program

Carlbrook was a 15-month program which consisted of five workshops (Integritas, Amicitia, Animus, Teneo, and Veneratio) which took place roughly every three months depending on the child's arrival at the school. Elizabeth Gilpin, who is a graduate of Carlbrook School, makes the following claim in Stolen, a memoir about her time there:

Closure
The school closed in December 2015 after giving notice a few days before end of the fall semester. The email announcement attributed the closure to declining enrollments.

In the news 
December 4, 2010: 16-year-old Forest Ferguson disappeared from Carlbrook School's campus in South Boston, Virginia. He was never found.
April 2017: Life Boat, a short film based on the exercise used in Animus, Carlbrook's third workshop, premiered at Tribeca Film Festival. It was directed by Jack Nicholson's daughter, Lorraine Nicholson, and stars Carlbrook graduate and author of Stolen, Elizabeth Gilpin.
July 20, 2021: Stolen, a memoir by Elizabeth Gilpin about the time she spent in the wilderness of the Appalachian Mountains and then at Carlbrook School was published.

References

External links
 Carlbrook School website (archived)

Boarding schools in Virginia
Private high schools in Virginia
Schools in Halifax County, Virginia
Therapeutic boarding schools in the United States
2002 establishments in Virginia
2015 disestablishments in Virginia
Educational institutions established in 2002
Educational institutions disestablished in 2015